Galeria may refer to:
 Galeria gens, an ancient Roman family
 Galeria Copiola, a Roman actress during the 1st century BC
 Galéria, a commune on the French island of Corsica

See also
Galerians